Agnibesa pictaria is a moth in the family Geometridae first described by Frederic Moore in 1888. It is found in India, Nepal and China.

Subspecies
Agnibesa pictaria pictaria (India, Nepal, China: Tibet)
Agnibesa pictaria brevibasis Prout, 1938 (China: Shanxi, Gansu, Sichuan, Yunnan, Tibet)

References

Moths described in 1888
Asthenini
Moths of Asia